The Oslava is a river in the Czech Republic, a left tributary of the Jihlava River. It originates in the Bohemian-Moravian Highlands at an elevation of 567 m and flows to Ivančice, where it enters the Jihlava River. It is 99.2 km long, and its basin area is 867 km2.

It flows through numerous towns and villages, including Nové Veselí, Ostrov nad Oslavou, Velké Meziříčí, Náměšť nad Oslavou, Oslavany and Ivančice. The Mostiště Reservoir is constructed on the river.

Its longest tributaries are the Balinka and Chvojnice rivers.

History
The first written mention of the river is from 1146, when it was called Ozlawa in a Latin text.

Fauna 
There were recorded 16 species of aquatic molluscs in the Oslava river: 8 species of gastropods and 8 species of bivalves. There lives endangered species of bivalve Unio crassus at the lower river section.

References

Rivers of the Vysočina Region
Rivers of the South Moravian Region
Brno-Country District
Žďár nad Sázavou District